Egon Egemann (born Egon Lackner; 1963 in Graz) studied classical violin and Jazz at Graz Music Academy in Austria. He settled in Switzerland following studies in Boston, USA and founded the Egon Family Orchestra. By the end of 1989 he had decided to follow a solo career and in 1990 was selected to represent Switzerland in the Eurovision Song Contest 1990 with the song "Musik klingt in die Welt hinaus". It was placed eleventh out of 22 entries at the contest, held in Zagreb.

Egemann returned to Eurovision in 1998, as composer of Switzerland's entry in Birmingham, "Lass ihn". Performed by Gunvor it came twenty-fifth (last) with no points.

References

Year of birth missing (living people)
Living people
Eurovision Song Contest entrants of 1990
Eurovision Song Contest entrants for Switzerland